Tommy & Oscar is an Italian animated television series co-created by Max Alessandrini and Iginio Straffi, with graphic creation by Pietro Dichiara and Carlo Rambaldi. It was the first major project from Rainbow, which later became a much larger television studio co-owned by the US company Viacom (now known as Paramount).

52 episodes over two seasons were made. An English-language voiceover was also made in the Canadian city of Montreal.

Premise
Professor Leonard is the classic mad, bizarre and eccentric scientist . His amazing inventions often end with unpredictable results. However, thanks to these inventions, his nephew Tommy becomes a superhero intent on protecting the world from Caesar, an unscrupulous businessman.

Tommy, a 10-year-old boy with his alien friend Oscar and his friends Yukari and Peter along with his uncle, Professor Leonard, join forces to stop the evil desires of Caesar. His strategies for getting rich, however, are diabolical plans to make money quickly without considering the disastrous consequences.

Fortunately, our heroes are not alone. There are Yukari, an expert in martial arts, and Peter, a talented Italo-African musician. Together they will have to save animals, protect forests and reveal complicated secrets.

Characters
The main town in the series is Rainbow City, which takes its name from the production company of the series.

 Tommy – A blond boy about 10 years of age who lives with his eccentric uncle Leonard and Oscar. He was voiced by Justin Bradley in the English dub.
 Oscar – A fun and weird pink alien who eats musical notes that can change his body at will. Oscar was voiced by Rick Jones.
 Yukari – A 10-year-old girl of Japanese origin, full of action. Her dance attack is the Katonga Dance. She was voiced by Jaclyn Linetsky.
 Uncle Leonard – Bizarre scientist, but a great inventor. Is Tommy's uncle and lives with him. Similar to  Doctor Emmett Brown from the 1980s film Back to the Future. He was voiced by A.J. Henderson
 Peter – Tommy's best friend, and he has a music store. He is voiced by Oliver Grainger.
 Woody Alien - is Oscar's friend who lives on their home planet: Pianota. His name is a parody of the name of director Woody Allen.
 Buck – A dog that can walk on their front legs, he lives with Tommy and Oscar.
 Caesar – Unscrupulous, low and ugly, he is convinced that the only thing that counts is money, and does not spare oppression to get rich. He was voiced by Mark Camacho.
 Ork and Dork – Pair of idiots apes, with speech but not of intellect. They works for Caesar as gorillas.
 Decibel - A robot tyrant of Pianota, a sort of alien counterpart to Caesar.
Since their first appearance in the two educational CD-ROM "The Phantom of the Theatre" (awarded in 1996 with the prestigious "Bologna Media Prize") and "Mission Music" (1998), the characters of Tommy and Oscar have been very successful worldwide, especially in Europe, Latin America and Asia.

Episodes
Season 1:

 Flying Animals

 Ghost in the Mine!

Season 2:

 Tommy & Oscar Show
 The mystery of Bluewater Lake
 Internetland
 The ghost of the Future
 Yukari in Distress
 An adventure in Tune Town
 Space Wars
 Prelude in C minor
 The rite of the seventh sun
 Underground Blues
 Operation sunflower
 The ultimate challenge
 Parallel universes
 Happy birthday Oscar
 Shadows on Planote
 The king of toys
 The secret of Olaf the viking
 Oscar's Dream
 The parrots' island
 The comics' revenge
 The hunt for treasure!
 Furry friends
 The abominable Orang Utan
 Arctic mystery
 Saving the Fairy Tales
 Bug invasion

Dubbing

References

External links

Rainbow Creative Entertainment official website
Max Alessandrini's official website
Big Cartoon Database sheet
English version of Tommy and Oscar: The movie
Watch Tommy & Oscar show on Tubi

1990s animated television series
2000s animated television series
Animated duos
Italian children's animated adventure television series
Italian children's animated comic science fiction television series
Television series about shapeshifting
Animated television series about children
Animated television series about extraterrestrial life
Television series by Rainbow S.r.l.
Fictional duos